William East may refer to:
 William East (1695–1737), British politician
 Sir William East, 1st Baronet of Hall Place, Maidenhead (1738–1819), of the East baronets
 William East (rower) (1866–1933), English sculling champion
 William East (cricketer) (1872–1926), English cricketer
 William Gordon East (1902–1998), English geographer and writer
 William G. East (1908–1985), American jurist

See also
 East (surname)